A series of war crimes was committed during the Kosovo War (early 1998 – 11 June 1999). The forces of the Slobodan Milošević regime committed rape, killed many Albanian civilians and expelled them during the war, along with the widespread destruction of civilian, cultural and religious property. According to Human Rights Watch, the vast majority of the violations which were committed from January 1998 to April 1999 were attributable to the Serbian police or the Yugoslav army. The violations also included war crimes which were committed by the Kosovo Liberation Army (KLA or the UÇK), such as kidnappings and summary executions of civilians. In 2014, the Humanitarian Law Center released a list of people who were killed or went missing during the war, including 8,661 Kosovo Albanian civilians, 1,797 ethnic Serbs and 447 civilians who were members of other ethnicities such as Romani people and Bosniaks.

Background

By the 1980s, the Kosovo Albanians constituted a majority in Kosovo. During the 1970s and 1980s, thousands of Serbs and Montenegrins left Kosovo, including some 57,000 during the 1970s alone. Social-economic, migration from underdeveloped areas, an increasingly adverse social-political climate and direct and indirect pressures were cited as the reasonings behind the departures. Slobodan Milošević gained political power by exploiting the grievances of Kosovo Serbs and pandering to the rising nationalist movement in Serbia.

Milošević abolished Kosovo's autonomy in 1989. With his rise to power, the Albanians started boycotting state institutions and ignoring the laws of the Republic of Serbia, culminating in the creation of the Republic of Kosova which received recognition from neighbouring Albania. Serbia (now in union with Montenegro as FR Yugoslavia) tried to maintain its political control over the province. With the formation of the Kosovo Liberation Army, a large number of the Kosovo Albanians joined and supported the movement. The Serbian police and Yugoslav army response was brutal. In 1997, international sanctions were applied to the Federal Republic of Yugoslavia because of persecution of Kosovo's Albanians by Yugoslav security forces.

Yugoslav war crimes

Persecution and ethnic cleansing

During the armed conflict in 1998, the Yugoslav Army and Serbian police used excessive and random force, which resulted in property damage, the displacement of the population and the death of civilians. Belgrade unleashed the alleged Operation Horseshoe in the summer of 1998, in which hundreds of thousands of Albanians were driven from their homes.

The withdrawal of the Organization for Security and Co-operation in Europe monitors on 20 March 1999, together with the start of NATO's bombing campaign, encouraged Milošević to implement a "campaign of expulsions". With the beginning of the NATO bombing of Yugoslavia, Operation Horseshoe was implemented, though the Yugoslav government maintained that the refugee crisis was caused by the bombings. The Yugoslav Army, Serbian police and Serb paramilitary forces in the spring of 1999, in an organized manner, initiated a broad campaign of violence against Albanian civilians in order to expel them from Kosovo and thus maintain the political control of Belgrade over the province.

According to the legally binding verdict of the International Criminal Tribunal for the former Yugoslavia, the Federal Army and Serbian police systematically attacked Albanian-populated villages after the NATO bombing of Yugoslavia that began on 24 March 1999; abused, robbed and killed civilians, ordering them to go to Albania or Montenegro, and burned their houses and destroyed their property. Nemanja Stjepanović claimed that within the campaign of violence, Kosovo Albanians were expelled from their homes, murdered, sexually assaulted, and had their religious buildings destroyed. The Yugoslav forces committed numerous war crimes during the implementation of a "joint criminal enterprise" whose aim was to "through the use of violence and terror, force a significant number of Kosovo Albanians to leave their homes and cross the border in order for the state government to retain control over Kosovo." The ethnic cleansing of the Albanian population was performed in the following way: first the Army surrounded a location, followed by shelling, then the police entered the village and often with them and the Army, and then crimes occurred (murders, beatings, expulsions, sexual violence ...).

According to the United Nations High Commissioner for Refugees, by June 1999, the Yugoslav military, Serbian police and paramilitaries had expelled around 850,000 Albanians from Kosovo, and several hundred thousand more were internally displaced, in addition to those displaced prior to March. Approximately 440,000 refugees crossed the border into Albania and 320,000 fled to North Macedonia, while Bosnia and Herzegovina received more than 30,000.

Presiding Judge Iain Bonomy, who imposed the sentence, said that "deliberate actions of these forces during the campaign provoked the departure of at least 700,000 ethnic Albanians from Kosovo in the short period from late March to early June 1999."

Destruction of settlements
HRW claims that the Yugoslav Army indiscriminately attacked Kosovo Albanian villages. Police and military forces had partially or completely destroyed thousands of Albanian villages in Kosovo by burning or shelling them. According to a UNHCR survey, nearly 40% of all residential houses in Kosovo were heavily damaged or completely destroyed by the end of the war. Out of a total of 237,842 houses, 45,768 were heavily damaged and 46,414 were destroyed. In particular, residences in the city of Peja was heavily damaged. More than 80% of the 5,280 houses in the city were heavily damaged (1,590) or destroyed (2,774).

Rapes

Widespread rape and sexual violence occurred during the conflict and the majority of victims were Kosovo Albanian women. In 2000, Human Rights Watch documented 96 cases while adding that "it is likely that the number is much higher". Years after the war, the figure put forward for the number of rape victims was 10,000-20,000. The figure of 20,000 however has not been verified, given the lack of serious investigations into wartime rapes, though the number is often cited in public opinion and by politicians in Kosovo. This number originated from a World Health Organization report and the US Center for Disease Control from information gathered by local NGOs. The Kosovo Women's Network gave the figure of over 10,000 girls and women who experienced wartime rape. Due to a lack of prosecutions against perpetrators, there has been a reluctance for women to come forward or testify.

Throughout the duration of the war, members of the Yugoslav army, police and paramilitaries would remove girls and women fleeing for safety from refugee columns and rape them, at times more than once and later released them to continue their journey. Other women had been subjected to rape in their homes, at times in front of their family or in temporary refuges located by the women for their elderly parents or children as they attempted to flee the conflict. Other women stayed in Kosovo and were without protection. The crimes by the Yugoslav military, paramilitary and police amounted to crimes against humanity and a war crime of torture.

Although numbers are difficult to determine, following the conflict, there were cases of women committing suicide, aborting their pregnancies, giving birth to children and later raising them or placing them up for adoption with a few instances of attempted strangulation of their babies. Postwar, the issue of wartime rape did not receive enough attention in the media and in political discourse within Kosovo and victims were left to deal with their experiences in private.

The government has founded a programme to help those victims. As by October 2018, 250 women have signed up, despite pushing on behalf of the Kosovan government by giving free specialized healthcare and trauma counseling for wartime rape survivors. Many of the girls were young girls, from 13 to 19 years old. Mostly rape were committed paramilitaries associated with Arkan group, where the majority of rapes are carried out in the presence of children and men who later were killed.

Vasfije Krasniqi-Goodman was first woman to break a taboo in Kosovo society by telling her story of sexual violence publicly. On April 14, 1999 paramilitaries and Serbian police in the village of Stanovc, Vushtrri entered the house of Krasniqi, who was 16 years old and took her to the Church of Babimovc where she was raped. Afterwards, she was threatened with the lives of her family if she revealed what happened.

Victims from rural areas however face difficulties obtaining documents which prove they had medical treatment, gave birth or had abortions as a result of rape from medical centres that were set up for refugees in Albania, North Macedonia or Montenegro after they were expelled from their homes. Victims have also been asked to provide statements they gave to prosecutors in investigations which they were interviewed as victims of rape.

Destruction of mosques, monuments and other traditional architecture 

Numerous Albanian cultural sites in Kosovo were destroyed during the Kosovo conflict (1998-1999) which constituted a war crime violating the Hague and Geneva Conventions. Religious objects were also damaged or destroyed. Of the 498 mosques in Kosovo that were in active use, the International Criminal Tribunal for the former Yugoslavia (ICTY) documented that 225 mosques sustained damage or destruction by the Yugoslav Serb army. In all, eighteen months of the Yugoslav Serb counterinsurgency campaign between 1998-1999 within Kosovo resulted in 225 or a third out of a total of 600 mosques being damaged, vandalised, or destroyed alongside other Islamic architecture during the conflict. Additionally 500 Albanian owned kulla dwellings (traditional stone tower houses) and three out of four well preserved Ottoman period urban centres located in Kosovo cities were badly damaged resulting in great loss of traditional architecture. Kosovo's public libraries, in particular 65 out of 183 were completely destroyed with a loss of 900,588 volumes, while Islamic libraries sustained damage or destruction resulting in the loss of rare books, manuscripts and other collections of literature. Archives belonging to the Islamic Community of Kosovo with records spanning 500 years were also destroyed. During the war, Islamic architectural heritage posed for Yugoslav Serb paramilitary and military forces as Albanian patrimony with destruction of non-Serbian architectural heritage being a methodical and planned component of ethnic cleansing in Kosovo.

Identity cleansing

Identity cleansing was a strategy employed by the government of Yugoslavia during the Kosovo War. Identity cleansing is defined as "confiscation of personal identification, passports, and other such documents to make it difficult or impossible for those driven out to return".

Expelled Kosovo Albanians claimed that they were systematically stripped of identity and property documents including passports, land titles, automobile license plates, identity cards and other documents. In conjunction with the policy of expelling ethnic Albanians from the province, the Yugoslavs would confiscate all documents that indicated the identity of those being expelled. Physicians for Human Rights reports that nearly 60% of respondents to its survey observed Yugoslav forces removing or destroying personal identification documents. Human Rights Watch also documented the common practice of "identity cleansing": refugees expelled toward Albania were frequently stripped of their identity documents and forced to remove the license plates from their vehicles. The occurrence of these acts suggested that the government was trying to block their return.

In addition to confiscating the relevant documents from their holders, efforts were also made to destroy any actual birth records (and other archives) which were maintained by governmental agencies, so as to make the "cleansing" complete (this latter tactic sometimes being referred to as archival cleansing).

Massacres of civilians

 Račak massacre (or "Operation Račak") on 15 January 1999 – 45 Albanians were rounded up and killed by Serbian special forces. The first forensic report, by a joint Yugoslavian and Belarusian team, concluded that those killed were not civilians. The massacre provoked a shift in Western policy towards the war.
 Imeraj massacre on 26 March 1999 – Serbian forces entered the village of Pemishtë/Cërkolez and killed 19 Albanian civilians including 13 women and children.
 Mala Kaludra massacre on 19 April 1999 – 23 Albanian refugees were killed by Serbian paramilitaries as they fled towards Montenegro.
 Suva Reka massacre on 26 March 1999 – 48 Albanian civilians killed, among them many children.
 Podujevo massacre – 19 Albanian civilians were killed, including women, children and the elderly.
 Massacre at Velika Kruša – According to the ICTY, Serbian Special Anti-Terrorist Units murdered 42 persons. There were also allegations of mass rape.
 Izbica massacre – Serbian forces killed about 93 Albanian civilians.
 Drenica massacre – there were 29 identified corpses discovered in a mass-grave, committed by Serbian law enforcement.
 Gornje Obrinje massacre – 18 corpses were found, but more people were slaughtered.
 Ćuška massacre – 41 known victims.
 Bela Crkva massacre – 62 known fatalities
 Meja massacre – at least 300 persons were killed by Serbian police and paramilitary forces in May 1999.
 Orahovac massacre – Estimates range from 50 to more than 200 ethnic Albanians killed
 Dubrava Prison massacre – Prison guards killed more than 70 Albanian prisoners in Dubrava Prison.
 Poklek massacre – 17 April 1999 – at least 47 people were forced into one room and systematically gunned down. The precise number of dead is unknown, although it is certain that 23 children under the age of fifteen were killed in the massacre.
 Vučitrn massacre – More than 100 Kosovo refugees were killed by Serbian Police.

Cover-up
Soon after NATO started bombing Yugoslavia, Slobodan Milošević ordered that all bodies in Kosovo that could be of interest to The Hague Tribunal should be removed. The Yugoslav Army systematically transported the corpses of Albanians to places like the Trepča Mines near Kosovska Mitrovica, where their remains were allegedly cremated. Thus, according to one source, it was estimated that between 1,200 and 1,500 bodies were burned in the Trepča Mines. However, these allegations surrounding the Trepča mines turned out to be false. More corpses of Kosovo Albanians were transported into Serbia, where the bodies were buried in mass-graves such as those at Batajnica.

In May 2001, the Serbian government announced that 86 bodies of Kosovo Albanians were thrown into the river Danube during the Kosovo War. After four months of excavations, Serbian forensic-experts located at least seven mass graves and some 430 bodies (including the corpses of women and children) in Central Serbia. Those sites included the graves at Batajnica near Belgrade, at Petrovo Selo in eastern Serbia and near Perućac Dam in western Serbia. So far, about 800 remains of Albanians killed and buried in mass graves in Serbia have been exhumed and returned to their families in Kosovo. Most of the bodies were discovered near Special Anti-Terrorist police bases where Serbian Anti-Terrorism units were stationed and trained in clandestine operations.

As a witness in the trial of eight police officers for war crimes against Albanian civilians during the Suva Reka massacre, Dragan Karleuša, the investigator of the Ministry of Interior of Serbia, testified that there are more graves in Serbia.

He commented, "why would they remove bodies in this way if the people had died normally," and concluded that they did not die normally and that the campaign to remove the bodies was, in fact, a cover-up for a "terrible crime".

KLA war crimes

Kidnappings and summary executions 
In some villages under Albanian control in 1998, militants drove ethnic-Serbs from their homes. Some of those who remained are unaccounted for and are presumed to have been abducted by the KLA and killed. The KLA detained an estimated 85 Serbs during its 19 July 1998 attack on Orahovac. 35 of these were subsequently released but the others remained. On 22 July 1998, the KLA briefly took control of the Belaćevac mine near the town of Obilić. Nine Serb mineworkers were captured that day and they remain on the International Committee of the Red Cross's list of the missing and are presumed to have been killed. In August 1998, 22 Serbian civilians were reportedly killed in the village of Klečka, where the police claimed to have discovered human remains and a kiln used to cremate the bodies. In September 1998, Serbian police collected 34 bodies of people believed to have been seized and murdered by the KLA, among them some ethnic Albanians, at Lake Radonjić near Glođane (Gllogjan) in what became known as the Lake Radonjić massacre.

According to the International Committee of the Red Cross and the ICTY, 97 Kosovo Serbs were kidnapped in 1998. According to a Serbian government report, from 1 January 1998 to 10 June 1999 the UÇK killed 988 people and kidnapped 287; of those killed, 335 were civilians, 351 were soldiers, 230 were police and 72 were unidentified; by nationality, 87 of the civilians killed were Serbs, 230 were Albanians, and 18 were of other nationalities.

Massacres of civilians

Incomplete list of massacres:
 Non-Albanian civilian disappearances in Kosovo – According to the Kosovo government's Commission on Missing Persons, 560 non-Albanians are still missing from the war, including 360 Serbs. They are believed to have been kidnapped by KLA in Kosovo and Metohija beginning in 1998 with the majority disappearing between June 1999 and December 2000 following the withdrawal of Yugoslav troops from the region.
 Lake Radonjić massacre – 34 individuals of Serb, Roma and Albanian ethnicity were discovered by a Serbian forensic team near the lake.
 Gnjilane killings in 1999 – The remains of 51 Serbs were discovered in mass graves after they were killed by Albanian militants. 
 Orahovac massacre – More than 100 Serbian and Roma civilians were kidnapped and placed in concentration camps, 47 were killed. 
 Staro Gračko massacre – 14 Serbian farmers were murdered by Albanian militants.
 Klečka killings – 22 Serb civilians were murdered and their bodies were cremated.
 Ugljare massacre – 15 Serbs were murdered by Albanian separatists.
 Peć massacre – 20 Serbs were murdered and their corpses were thrown down wells.
 Volujak massacre – 25 male Kosovo Serb civilians were murdered by members of the KLA in July 1998.
 Albanian leaders massacre - 5 Albanian leaders were killed after they had attended the funeral of an Albanian lawyer.

Ethnic cleansing

According to a 2001 report by Human Rights Watch (HRW):

Use of child soldiers
Around 10% of all KLA insurgents engaged in fighting during the conflict were under the age of 18, with some being as young as 13. The majority of them were 16 and 17 years old. Around 2% were below the age of 16. These were mainly girls recruited to cook for the soldiers rather than to actually fight.

Prison camps

Some of the prison camps in Kosovo were:
Lapušnik prison camp – A KLA prison camp in Glogovac where 23 Serbs and Albanians were killed. Hardina Bala; An UÇK prison guard was found guilty of torture, mistreatment of prisoners and murder for crimes committed at the camp.
 Prison Camp Jablanica – 10 individuals were detained and tortured by KLA forces including: one Serb, three Montenegrins, one Bosnian, three Albanians, and two victims of unknown ethnicity. 
 Detention camps in Albania – Serbs and Roma civilians kidnapped by Albanian militants and taken across the border into Albania where they were held, interrogated, tortured and in most cases killed. Several investigations into these camps have led to evidence detailing that several prisoners had their organs removed.

Organ theft allegations

During and after the 1999 war, accusations were made of people being killed in order to remove their organs to sell them on the black market. Various sources estimated that the number of victims ranged from a "handful", up to 50, between 24 and 100 to over 300. The allegations were first publicized by then Chief Prosecutor for the ICTY Carla Del Ponte in her book The Hunt: Me and the War Criminals in 2008, causing a large response. According to the book after the end of the war in 1999, Kosovo Albanians were smuggling organs of between 100 and 300 Serbs and other minorities from the province to Albania. The perpetrators are said to have strong links to the Kosovo Liberation Army (UÇK). Claims were investigated first by the ICTY who found medical equipment and traces of blood in and around the house in Albania that had allegedly been used as an operating theater to remove the organs. They were then investigated by the UN, who received witness reports from many ex-UÇK fighters who stated that several of the prisoners had their organs removed.

In 2011; French media outlet; France24 released a classified UN document written in 2003 which documented the crimes. In 2010, a report by Swiss prosecutor Dick Marty to the Council of Europe (CoE) uncovered "credible, convergent indications" of an illegal trade in human organs going back over a decade, including the deaths of a "handful" of Serb captives killed for this purpose.

On 25 January 2011, the report was endorsed by the CoE, which called for a full and serious investigation. Since the issuance of the report, however, senior sources in the European Union Rule of Law Mission in Kosovo (EULEX) and many members of the European Parliament have expressed serious doubts regarding the report and its foundations, believing Marty failed to provide "any evidence" concerning the allegations. A EULEX special investigation was launched in August 2011. Responding to this allegation, the head of the war crimes unit of Eulex (the European Law and Justice Mission in Kosovo), Matti Raatikainen, claimed "The fact is that there is no evidence whatsoever in this case, no bodies. No witnesses. All the reports and media attention to this issue have not been helpful to us. In fact they have not been helpful to anyone." He described these allegations as a "distraction" that prevented the war crimes unit from finding the remains of close to 2,000 individuals of Serb, Albanian, and Roma ethnicity still missing in the conflict. The EU Report which was released in 2014 concluded that organ theft and trafficking took place but "on a very limited scale with a few individuals involved".

Other
Summary killings of prominent ethnic Albanian leaders and intellectuals have also been reported (including Bajram Kelmendi).

NATO

Civilian casualties 

The Serbian government and a number of international human rights groups (e.g., Amnesty International) claimed that NATO had carried out war crimes by bombing civilians. According to Human Rights Watch, between 489 and 528 civilians were killed by NATO airstrikes. According to Serbian sources, the number of civilian casualties caused by the NATO bombing stood at 2,500.

Incomplete list of civilian casualties caused by NATO:
 Grdelica train bombing
 NATO bombing of Albanian refugees near Đakovica
 Koriša bombing
 NATO bombing of the Radio Television of Serbia headquarters
 Lužane bus bombing
 Cluster bombing of Niš (Cluster bombs were illegal by 2008, but were legal in 1999)
 US bombing of the People's Republic of China embassy in Belgrade
Varvarin bridge bombing

Aftermath

Refugees
An estimated 200,000 Serbs and Roma fled Kosovo after the war. Romani people were also driven out after being harassed by Albanian gangs and vengeful individuals. The Yugoslav Red Cross registered 247,391 mostly Serb refugees by November 1999. During the Kosovo War, over 90,000 Serbian and other non-Albanian refugees fled the war-torn province. In the days after the Yugoslav Army withdrew, over 164,000 Serbs (around 75%) and 24,000 Roma (around 85%) left Kosovo and many of the remaining civilians were victims of abuse. After Kosovo and other Yugoslav Wars, Serbia became home to the highest number of refugees and IDPs (including Kosovo Serbs) in Europe.

In 2007, tens of thousands of Serbs were preparing to flee the province of Kosovo, packing their bags, fearing a new wave of ethnic cleansing at the hands of the Kosovo's new Albanian-led administration.

Killings
According to a 2001 Human Rights Watch report, as "many as one thousand Serbs and Roma have been murdered or have gone missing since 12 June 1999."

According to a Serbian government report, in the period from 10 June 1999 – 11 November 2001, when NATO had been in control in Kosovo, 847 people were reported to have been killed and 1,154 kidnapped. This comprised both civilians and security forces personnel.

Destruction of Serbian heritage 

In total, 155 Serbian Orthodox churches and monasteries were destroyed between 11 June 1999 and 19 March 2004, after the end of the Kosovo War and including the 2004 unrest in Kosovo. KLA fighters are accused of vandalizing Devič monastery and terrorizing the staff. The KFOR troops said KLA rebels vandalized centuries-old murals and paintings in the chapel and stole two cars and all the monastery's food. Many other churches were the target of attacks by Albanian militants.

War crimes trials

Criminal prosecutions of Serbian leaders before the ICTY

Slobodan Milošević, along with Milan Milutinović, Nikola Šainović, Dragoljub Ojdanić and Vlajko Stojiljković were charged by the International Criminal Tribunal for the Former Yugoslavia (ICTY) with crimes against humanity including murder, forcible population transfer, deportation and "persecution on political, racial or religious grounds". Further indictments were leveled in October 2003 against former armed forces chief of staff Nebojša Pavković, former army corps commander Vladimir Lazarević, former police official Vlastimir Đorđević and the current head of Serbia's public security, Sreten Lukić. All were indicted for crimes against humanity and violations of the laws or customs of war. Milosevic died in ICTY custody before sentencing.

The Court has pronounced the following verdicts:

 Milan Milutinović, former President of the Republic of Serbia and Yugoslav Foreign Minister, acquitted.
 Nikola Šainović, Yugoslav Deputy Prime Minister, guilty on all counts, sentenced to 22 years in prison.
 Dragoljub Ojdanić, Chief of General Staff of the VJ, guilty to two counts, sentenced to 15 years in prison.
 Nebojša Pavković, commander of Third Army, guilty on all counts, sentenced to 22 years in prison.
 Vladimir Lazarević, commander of the Pristina Corps VJ, guilty of two counts, sentenced to 15 years in prison.
 Sreten Lukić, Chief of Staff of the Serbian police, guilty on all counts, sentenced to 22 years in prison.
 Vlastimir Đorđević, Chief of the Public Security Department of Serbia's Ministry of Internal Affairs, guilty of five counts, including crimes against humanity and war crimes, and sentenced to 27 years in prison.

Šainović, Pavković and Lukić were convicted as members of a joint criminal enterprise, while the others were convicted of aiding and abetting crimes.

Domestic Trials

First cases
The first trials in Serbia & FRY regarding the atrocities against Kosovar Albanians had occurred in 2000 in front martial courts, as accounts of murder. The Niš Military Court had in late 2000 found guilty for the murder of 2 Albanian civilians on 28 March 1999 in the village of Gornja Sušica near Priština: Captain Dragiša Petrović and army reservists sergeant Nenad Stamenković and Tomica Jović. Petrović got 4 years and 10 months, while Stamenković and Jović sentenced to four and a half years each. The trial had dragged on as the Supreme Military Court had abolished the verdicts and issued a retrial, until finished in late 2003 in front of it when all three indictees were found guilty for the same crime, however their sentences increased – 9 years for Petrovic and 7 for Stamenkovic and Jovic each – guilty of a "war crime".

However, the very first domestic "war crimes" (under that classification) trial in FRY regarding Kosovo had occurred in 1999–02, against a Yugoslav Army soldier called Ivan Nikolić, indicted for murdering 2 ethnic Albanians in a village near the Kosovan town of Podujevo called Penduh on 24 March 1999. They were originally charged for murder, and being the very first trial regarding an atrocity committed against Albanians it was paved with a lot of controversy. Nikolic was originally acquitted of all charges, but in June 2000 the Supreme Court of Serbia had abolished the verdict and ordered for a retrial. Instead of murder, the indictment was changed by the prosecution mid-trial to "a war crime against civilian population" (according to Article 142 of the FRY Criminal Code), paving the way for prosecution of war crimes against ethnic Albanians in Serbia and Yugoslavia. The trial, organized in front of the District Court in Prokuplje, finally ended with a guilty verdict in 2002, Nikolic sentenced to 8 years of prison.

Orahovac Case

One of the more known cases was that of Boban Petković and Đorđe Simić, due to the controversial stalling, both of whom are Serbian police reservists; Petković was suspect of murder of 3 Albanian civilians in the village of Rija near Orahovac and Simić as an accomplice. Although the investigation was opened in June 1999 at the Prizren District Court, due to the withdrawal of Serbia's judiciary in favor of UNMIK it had opened up in the District Court of Požarevac in late '99. A judgement was issued in mid 2000 and Petković was found guilty in two counts of murder and sentenced to 4 years and 10 months of prison, while Simić to 1 year as an accomplice. Serbia's Supreme Court had abolished the judgements in 2001 and ordered for a retrial. In a new trial, in which according to the new procedure the individuals were indicted for a "war crime", the District Court of Pozarevac had sentenced Petkovic to 5 years of prison with obligatory psychiatric assistance, while acquitting Simic of all charges. The Supreme Court had considering both the Defense and the Prosecution again abolished the judgements in 2006. The judicial reforms and new organization of Serbia's judicial system had caught up with the case, so it finally began in 2008, under the High Court of Požarevac. However, due to heavy procedural difficulties, demanding cooperation with the EULEX for evidence from the ground, as well as the indicteds' lack of appearance in front of the court, the trial had reached a stalemate in 2011 and 2012. In March 2013 Petković was found guilty by the Požarevac High Court for committing a war crime against civilian population and sentenced to 5 years. The process is currently as of 2014 in its appeal stadium.

War Crimes System
In dedication to the very big issue of prosecuting war crimes committed in the 1990s and due to their sensitive nature, Serbia had founded a special "War Crimes Prosecution" dedicated to investigating and prosecuting war crimes, as well as having special War Crimes divisions within its court system with specific panels. It is the only country in Former Yugoslavia which has done so, all the others prosecuting war crimes under normal judicial procedures.

Suva Reka
Among the more notable results is the "Suva Reka Case" (the Suva Reka massacre), the trial for began in 2006. Ex policemen Milorad Nišavić and Slađan Čukarić and State security member Miroslav Petković were found guilty by the War Crimes Panel of the Belgrade High Court, for the murder of 49 or 50 Albanian civilians in Suva Reka on 26 March 1999, including a total of 48 members of a Berisha family. Nišavić got 13, Petković 15 and Čukarić 20 years of prison. Three other policemen were acquitted, while in a separate trial Suva Reka police commander Radojko Repanović was found guilty due to command responsibility and sentenced to 20 years of prison. Two other policemen were acquitted, as well as a 3rd one, against whom the prosecution had dropped the case mid-trial. In 2010 Belgrade's Appeal Court had confirmed all verdicts against the 6 directly responsible indicted, but has dismissed Repanovic's verdict and ordered for a retrial. One of the acquitted, the commander of the 37th Police Unit Radoslav Mitrović, remains in custody as of 2013 along with several other members suspect for other accounts of war crimes. Repanović was found guilty on same counts and sentenced to 20 years of prison in late 2010 by Belgrade's War Crimes Panel and in 2011 Belgrade's Appeal Court had confirmed the judgement.

More findings of war crimes against civilians

Lawful authorities in Serbia do not deny war crimes accuses, which were made public by Slobodan Stojanovic, the retired commander of Serbian Police, who is a protected witness by Serbian state.

During 1998, as a member of Serbian Police, he had taken part in a series of actions for which he testifies that were taken against Albanian civilians across Kosovo.

While on the Radio Free Europe, he said that Serbian Senior Officials were informed about every action that Serbian Forces members had taken in the territory of Kosovo, through the chain of command that was called "territory's clearance".

He says that he has seen enough horror, carried out by Serbian Forces, which influenced his withdrawal from Serbian Police.

He explained one of the occasions which he says were routine.

"I have been everywhere and when I saw what was happening, I pulled out. Simply, without any reason, they would approach to people and threat them, by demanding money from them. If one lacked money, they would kill them, without any other reason" he said, explaining that he knew names of those who had killed innocent people by just saying "A good Albanian is good only as a dead Albanian".

He accused his former commander, Nenad Stojkovic for burning of villages in Mitrovica and crimes committed there.

"Nenad Stojkovic is responsible for what we had done in Mitrovica. They burnt down the whole village, that's what they would do. They would take the order and that is it, some short words. When they took the order "matches" it meant 'burn the whole village down', whereas when they took the order 'tyres' it meant kill people. When the commander Mitrovic used to say 'take him for tanning', this would mean that Albanian man must be killed" says Stojanovic.

He has also talked about other cases, which according to him were crimes, for which, however no one has claimed the responsibility.

Indictments to KLA leaders
The ICTY also leveled indictments against KLA members Fatmir Limaj, Haradin Bala, Isak Musliu and Agim Murtezi, indicted for crimes against humanity. They were arrested on 17–18 February 2003. Charges were soon dropped against Agim Murtezi as a case of mistaken identity, whereas Fatmir Limaj was acquitted of all charges on 30 November 2005 and released. The charges were in relation to the prison camp run by the defendants at Lapušnik between May and July 1998.

In March 2005, a UN tribunal indicted Kosovo Prime Minister Ramush Haradinaj for war crimes against the Serbs, on 8 March he tendered his resignation. Haradinaj, an ethnic Albanian, was a former commander who led units of the Kosovo Liberation Army and was appointed Prime Minister after winning an election of 72 votes to three in the Kosovo's Parliament in December 2004. Haradinaj was acquitted on all counts, but was recalled due to witness intimidation and faces a retrial. However, on 29 November 2012, Haradaniaj and all KLA fighters were acquitted from all charges.

According to Human Rights Watch, senior leaders of the KLA accused of killings and body transfers to Albania remain at-large, some in high government posts. In 2016, a special court was established in the Hague to investigate crimes committed in 1999-2000 by members of the Kosovo Liberation Army against ethnic minorities and political opponents.

In late September 2020, The Hague court, a special court for the international justice began a long-delayed hearing on the war crimes committed by Kosovo fighters. The proceedings were started with an aim of affecting the tense relation between Kosovo and Serbia.

The Kosovo Specialist Chambers and Specialist Prosecutor's Office is investigating Kosovo's president Hashim Thaçi, senior Kosovar politician Kadri Veseli, and other KLA figures for war crimes and crimes against humanity. A preliminary indictment of Thaçi, Veseli, and several others was announced in June 2020. In September 2020, Salih Mustafa, the former commander of the KLA's BIA Unit, was arrested. His indictment, which accuses him of being responsible for the torture and murder of "persons taking no active part in hostilities", was released at the same time.

The charges against Kosovo’s president Hashim Thaçi were not announced, but his alleged involvement in war crimes prevented him from attending the signing ceremony for an agreement on limited steps taken towards economic normalisation with his Serbian counterpart, Aleksandar Vučić.

See also
 Kosovo War
 Operation Horseshoe
 Operation Allied Force
 2004 unrest in Kosovo
 20th century history of Kosovo
 Yugoslav Wars
 List of massacres in the Kosovo War

References

Further reading

External links
 Kosovo War Crimes Chronology
 Human Rights in Kosovo: As Seen, As Told, 1999 (OSCE report)
 Under Orders: War Crimes in Kosovo (Human Right Watch report)
 Report of the UN Secretary-General, 31 January 1999
 Kosovo: Ethnic Cleansing (Michigan State University)
 Human Rights Watch: Rape as a weapon of Ethnic Cleansing
 Erasing History: Ethnic Cleansing in Kosovo (Report released by the U.S. Department of State)
 ICTY: Indictment of Milutinović et al., "Kosovo", 5 September 2002
 Human Right Watch Photo Gallery
  (dedicated to the study, research, and documentation of the destruction and damage of historic heritage during the Balkan Wars of the 1990s. The website contains judicial documents from the International Criminal Tribunal for the former Yugoslavia (ICTY)).

 
1998 crimes in Kosovo
1999 crimes in Kosovo
1998 in military history
1999 in military history
Violence in Kosovo
Persecution of Serbs
Kosovo Liberation Army
History of NATO
Serbian–Albanian conflict